Cryptid whales are cetaceans claimed to exist by cryptozoologists on the basis of informal sightings, but not accepted by taxonomists as they lack formal descriptions of type specimens. Over the past few hundred years, sailors and whalers have reported seeing whales they cannot identify. The most well-known are Giglioli's Whale, the rhinoceros dolphin, Trunko, the high-finned sperm whale, and the Alula whale.

Multiple-finned cetaceans 
Records of two-finned cetaceans have been described in unverified written accounts by naturalists over the past few hundred years.

Giglioli's Whale 

Giglioli's Whale, or Amphiptera pacifica, is a purported species of whale observed by Enrico Hillyer Giglioli. It is described to have two dorsal fins, a feature which no known whales have. It was very close to the ship (too close to shoot with a cannon) and was observed for a quarter of an hour, allowing Giglioli to make very detailed observations. Other unusual features include the presence of two long sickle-shaped flippers and a lack of throat pleats. Another report of a two finned whale of roughly the same size was recorded from the ship Lily off the coast of Scotland the following year. In 1983 between Corsica and the French mainland, French zoologist Jacques Maigret sighted a similar looking creature. Although it has not been proven to exist, it was given a "classification" by Giglioli. The whale may have been a genetic mutation. Given the species' alleged size and attributes, it is extremely doubtful such a species would not have been taken (and reported) by modern commercial whalers, bringing into doubt its very existence.

Rhinoceros dolphin 

The rhinoceros dolphin (Delphinus rhinoceros or Cetodipteros rhinoceros) is a purported species of dolphin – or dolphin-like whale – said to have an additional dorsal fin on or near the head, reminiscent of a rhinoceros horn. Jean René Constant Quoy and Joseph Gaimard allegedly discovered this dolphin off the coast of the Sandwich Islands and New South Wales. It supposedly possesses two dorsal fins, much like Giglioli's Whale. One is near the head, where the neck would be on terrestrial animals, and the other is farther back than the dorsal fin of any other dolphin. These have a somewhat large size, and are black with large white blotches. Michel Raynal suggested it may have been misobserved somersault behavior (with the first "fin" being a flipper and the second being a fluke), but dismissed it as unlikely. Georges Cuvier proposed it may have been an optical illusion and Richard Ellis suggested it may have been a dolphin with a remora stuck on its head. Markus Bühler pointed out that one dolphin's deformed jaw curiously resembles the oddly placed fin or "horn" of the rhinoceros dolphin. Supernumerary dorsal fins are apparently a genuine mutation; however, none have turned up a considerable distance from where the dorsal fin should be positioned, let alone on the head. Raynal and Sylvestre (1991) argued that since Quoy and Gaimard observed multiple individuals exhibiting the morphology, a distinct species, Cetodipterus rhinoceros, would be more probable than a pod of disfigured individuals. Another argued hypothesis is that that pod was part of an inbred population, which led to the mutation. Another possibility is that Quoy and Gaimard observed specimens which were neither deformed nor members of an unknown species or population, but rather misidentified a pair of beaked whales that, by perspective, appeared to be one single creature.

High-finned sperm whale 

The high-finned sperm whale, or the high-finned cachalot, is an alleged variant or relative of the known sperm whale, Physeter macrocephalus, with an unusually tall dorsal fin from the North Atlantic. The physician Sir Robert Sibbald, in 1687, described an alleged stranded female individual on Orkney, saying its dorsal fins was similar to a "mizzen mast", and the whale, based on Sibbald's account, was described as P. tursio. However, naturalist Georges Cuvier disregarded Sibbald's claim as a bad description of the carcass, as well as dismissing the name P. tursio. Another alleged sighting was off the Annapolis Basin, Nova Scotia, Canada on September 27, 1946, where the creature was apparently trapped there for two days.

Alula whale 
The Alula whale, or the Alula killer, or Orcinus mörzer-bruynsus, was discussed and illustrated for the first time, but not formally named, by W. F. J. Mörzer Bruyns in Field Guide of Whales and Dolphins, purportedly being seen by the author several times. It resembles a sepia brown killer whale with a well-rounded forehead and white, star-like scars on the body. He wrote they are present in the deep coastal waters in eastern Gulf of Aden to Socotra, and they were seen in April, May, June, and September. Bruyns reported that they maintained a cruising speed of 4 knots, and traveled in groups of 4 to 8, but usually 6.

Unidentified beaked whales 
The "Moore's Beach monster", an initially unidentified carcass found in 1925 on Moore's Beach on Monterey Bay was identified by the California Academy of Sciences as a Baird's beaked whale.

Regarding similar cases relating to beaked whales, an unknown type of large beaked whale of similar size to fully grown Berardius bairdii have been reported to live in the Sea of Okhotsk. These whales are claimed to have heads somewhat resembling Longman's beaked whales, and there have been claims that records of strandings of these whales exist along the areas within and adjacent to Tatar Strait in the 2010s. In addition, possible new species of beaked whales have been described to be present in the coastal and pelagic waters of Abashiri and Shiretoko Peninsula northeastern Hokkaido.

See also
List of cryptids

References 

Cryptozoology
Whales